Cameron Sexton (born November 11, 1970) is an American politician serving as a Republican member of the Tennessee House of Representatives for the 25th district. He is the 83rd and current Speaker of the House in the Tennessee House of Representatives, having held that position since 2019. Sexton served as Majority Caucus Chairman prior to becoming speaker. He has been notable during his tenure for his support of victims of violent crime, patient-centered health care reforms, and his opposition to face mask and COVID-19 vaccine requirements within the state.

Biography

Sexton is a 1989 graduate of Oak Ridge High School. He received a B.A. in Public Administration from the University of Tennessee in 1994.

Sexton served as a community liaison for former Congressman Van Hilleary.

Career in politics

2010-22
Sexton has served as a member of the Tennessee House of Representatives since 2010. Sexton was elected as House Majority Whip for the 108th General Assembly, served as the Majority Caucus Chairman for the 111th General Assembly and became Speaker of the House in 2019.

In 2013, he sponsored legislation allowing businesses to file forms electronically instead of through the mail for the Work Opportunity Tax Credit.

Sexton has also served as House Health Committee Chairman for both the 109th and 110th General Assemblies. In 2016, former Speaker Beth Harwell appointed him to serve as Chairman of the 3-Star Healthy Taskforce, which focused on finding an innovative approach to enhance health coverage while being fiscally responsible - a concept that was never previously proposed to the Centers for Medicare and Medicaid Services.

Rep. Sexton was elected by his peers to serve as Republican Caucus Chairman before the beginning of the 111th Tennessee General Assembly. Under his leadership, Tennessee became a national leader in patient-centered health reforms through the "CARE Plan". As chief architect, Sexton partnered with his colleagues to improve both access and the quality of care available to citizens through this plan, which stands for "Consumerism, increasing Access, improving Rural health systems, and Empowering patients". The overall goal of the CARE Plan was to ensure individuals and families can make medical decisions with limited interference from insurance companies and the government.

Speaker of the House

Sexton was elected the 83rd Speaker of the Tennessee House of Representatives on August 23, 2019, and he has since been reelected to continue serving in this role.

As speaker, Sexton has focused on protecting the public from violent criminals and standing with victims of violent crime through truth in sentencing. In 2021, he and the General Assembly passed a truth in sentencing solution that mandates 100 percent sentences for 31 different violent offenses historically targeting women and children. An additional truth in sentencing law approved by the legislature in 2022 drew widespread, bipartisan praise from Memphis Mayor Jim Strickland and stakeholders across the state. This resource adds eight additional extremely violent offenses to the list of 100 percent sentences handed down by a judge or jury. It also enables lower-level violent criminals to earn programming credits that may reduce their sentences from 100 to 85 percent.

Additionally, Sexton has led efforts to save the state's independent pharmacies through Pharmacy Benefits Manager (PBM) Reform legislation. The bill closes loopholes in existing state law to address PBM reimbursement rates for the dispensing of prescription drugs or devices by independent pharmacies. It also guarantees these entities are reimbursed at a rate no less than the actual cost of a drug or device dispensed. This is expected to promote competition in the marketplace, which will lower overall costs by eliminating the issue of insurance companies steering patients away from their trusted pharmacies.

Sexton has also prioritized the creation and funding of statewide mental health courts to help address Tennessee's ongoing mental health crisis. The legislation provides critical resources early on so patients can achieve successful futures. This will enhance public safety in communities across the state.

In 2021, Sexton voted against the removal of the Nathan Bedford Forrest Bust, as well as the busts of Admiral David Glasgow Farragut and Admiral Albert Gleaves from the Tennessee State Capitol to the Tennessee State Museum, along with Lieutenant Governor Randy McNally; however, the busts and portrait were removed. After the vote, Sexton said, "There has only been one perfect person to walk on this earth – everyone else has fallen short. Our country was established by imperfect people who made a great country that stands for hope, opportunity, and liberty. Trying to judge past generations’ actions based on today’s values and the evolution of societies is not an exercise I am willing to do because I think it is counterproductive. It is much more productive to learn from our past and not repeat the imperfections of the past. Any attempt to erase the past only aligns society with the teaching of communism, which believes the present dominates the past.
From the very beginning, the legislature has tried to follow the process and procedure in a respectful manner, and we did that today. Moving forward, the legislature will be working on revising current law to include a more significant voice of those elected.”

During the COVID-19 pandemic in Tennessee, Sexton supported the prohibition of face mask and COVID-19 vaccine requirements within the state. In December 2021, Sexton said Tennessee had had about 14,000 confirmed deaths from COVID (out of 1.3 million cases of COVID), and said: "That’s barely 1%." As of January 30, 2022, Tennessee, with 1.8 million cases, ranked 5th in number of confirmed COVID cases per capita (264 per 1,000; highest of any state in the south), and 7th by number of deaths per capita (326 per 100,000; 22,000 deaths total) in the United States, as its 54% full vaccination rate lagged behind the US average of 64%.

In October 2021, Sexton introduced controversial legislation as part of a special session allowing partisan school board elections statewide. The initial legislation would have required all school board elections statewide to be partisan but was trimmed to allow local parties to call for partisan school board elections after some GOP objection. The legislation still had the result of making most school board elections statewide partisan, however. This act was strongly believed to be an attempt to reduce the ability of Democrats and people with Democrat-leaning views to win election to school boards throughout the state, and to have been motivated by GOP opposition to critical race theory, mask mandates, and a perception of increasing liberalization of education throughout the country. The legislation was opposed by the Tennessee School Board Association and many school districts throughout the state.

In April 2022, Speaker Sexton and General Assembly members unanimously approved legislation requiring each local education agency in Tennessee to adopt policies prohibiting the instruction of anti-Semitic concepts while also banning all anti-Semitic acts and practices committed against individuals or institutions based upon their Jewish religious practices, the principles of Judaism, shared Jewish ancestry or ethnic characteristics. The solution also requires school districts to submit an annual report to the state’s department of education regarding investigations of any complaints filed alleging discriminatory anti-Semitic acts or practices have been committed.

On January 27, 2022, Sexton interjected as Representative John Ray Clemmons tried to honor International Holocaust Remembrance Day inside the House chamber. Clemmons began his honoring of the day by referring to the Auschwitz concentration camp, which the US Army liberated from the Nazis, to the recent banning by a Tennessee county education board of the Pulitzer Prize-winning Holocaust graphic novel Maus. A few minutes into Clemmons' speech, while he was denouncing anti-Semitism and neo-Nazism, Sexton abruptly interrupted him mid-sentence and reminded Clemmons his honoring of International Holocaust Remembrance Day did not fall within meeting guidelines. Sexton said his objection was that Clemmons' honoring was being made during the "welcoming and honoring" portion of the calendar. Sexton did not support the school board's decision to remove 'Maus.'

In January 2022, asked in an interview whether he thinks any of the legislation he has supported on COVID and the banning of abortions and critical race theory education makes it easier or harder to attract businesses and people to the state, Sexton responded "... we haven’t seen really much of a decrease in that. As far as people moving here — I don’t know. I mean, maybe if you’re a more progressive, you might not want to come to Tennessee...."

Personal life
Sexton is married to his wife, Lacey McRae Sexton, a pharmacist, and he has two children from a previous marriage.

References

1970 births
21st-century American politicians
Face masks during the COVID-19 pandemic
Living people
Nathan Bedford Forrest
Speakers of the Tennessee House of Representatives
Republican Party members of the Tennessee House of Representatives